Below are the rosters of the minor league affiliates of the Pittsburgh Pirates:

Players

Carter Bins

Carter Bins (born October 7, 1998) is an American professional baseball catcher in the Pittsburgh Pirates organization.

Bins attended Angelo Rodriguez High School in Fairfield, California. He hit .313/.427/.447 with 9 RBIs in 67 at-bats in his senior year. He was First-Team All Monticello Empire League honors and was twice named Defensive Player of the Year.

Bins was drafted in the 35th round of the 2016 draft by the Philadelphia Phillies but chose to attend Fresno State University. Bins started at catcher for the Fresno State Bulldogs baseball team for his three years there, earning Academic All-Mountain West honors each year. In his career at Fresno State, Bins hit .289/.383/.465 with 19 home runs and 96 RBI in 679 plate appearances. Bins was regarded as an excellent defensive catcher in college and was considered among the best in the 2019 draft. He was drafted by the Seattle Mariners in the 11th round of the 2019 MLB draft. Bins signed with the Mariners for a $325,000 signing bonus 

Bins debuted in the minors with the Everett AquaSox, then of the Class A Short Season Northwest League. He played 50 games for the AquaSox, hitting .208/.391/.357 with 7 home runs and 26 RBI.

On July 28, 2021, Bins was traded to the Pittsburgh Pirates along with Joaquin Tejada in exchange for Tyler Anderson.

Fresno State Bulldogs bio

Cody Bolton

Carl Donovan Bolton (born June 19, 1998) is an American professional baseball pitcher in the Pittsburgh Pirates organization.

Bolton attended Tracy High School in Tracy, California. As a senior, he went 9–2 with a 1.13 ERA, striking out 97 batters in 68 innings. After his senior year, he was drafted by the Pittsburgh Pirates in the sixth round of the 2017 Major League Baseball draft. He signed with the Pirates, forgoing his commitment to play college baseball at the University of Michigan.

After signing, Bolton made his professional debut with the Rookie-level Gulf Coast Pirates. In nine starts, he pitched to a 3.16 ERA. Bolton spent 2018 with the West Virginia Power of the Class A South Atlantic League, going 3–3 with a 3.65 ERA in nine starts, and began 2019 with the Bradenton Marauders of the Class A-Advanced Florida State League, where he was named Pitcher of the Week on May 13 as well as an All-Star. He was promoted to the Altoona Curve of the Class AA Eastern League in June. Over 21 starts between the two clubs, Bolton went 8–6 with a 3.28 ERA, striking out 102 over  innings. He did not play a minor league game in 2020 since the season was cancelled due to the COVID-19 pandemic. He began the 2021 season on the injured list with a knee injury and underwent surgery in May, forcing him to miss the whole season. He was assigned to the Indianapolis Indians of the Triple-A International League for the 2022 season. Over thirty games (14 starts), he went 4-2 with a 3.09 ERA and 82 strikeouts over  innings.

Mike Burrows

Michael Thomas Burrows (born November 8, 1999) is an American professional baseball pitcher in the Pittsburgh Pirates organization.

Burrows attended Waterford High School in Waterford, Connecticut. As a senior in 2018, he went 6–0 with a 0.38 ERA and 98 strikeouts over 44 innings. After the season, he was selected by the Pittsburgh Pirates in the 11th round of the 2018 Major League Baseball draft. He signed for $500,000, forgoing his commitment to play college baseball for the UConn Huskies baseball team.

Burrows made his professional debut with the Rookie-level Gulf Coast League Pirates, pitching 14 innings and not giving up an earned run. He played the 2019 season with the West Virginia Black Bears of the Class A Short Season New York–Penn League with whom he started 11 games and went 2–3 with a 4.33 ERA over  innings. He did not play a minor league game in 2020 due to the cancellation of the minor league season caused by the COVID-19 pandemic. Burrows spent the 2021 season with the Greensboro Grasshoppers of the High-A East, although he missed time due to injury. Over 13 starts, he went 2–2 with a 2.20 ERA, 66 strikeouts, and twenty walks over 49 innings. After the season, he was selected to play in the Arizona Fall League with the Surprise Saguaros. He was assigned to the Altoona Curve of the Double-A Eastern League to begin the 2022 season. In mid-June, he was promoted to the Indianapolis Indians of the Triple-A International League. He was selected to represent the Pirates alongside Henry Davis at the 2022 All-Star Futures Game. Over 24 games (22 starts) between Altoona and Indianapolis, he went 5-6 with a 4.01 ERA and 111 strikeouts over  innings.

On November 15, 2022, the Pirates selected Burrow's contract and added him to the 40-man roster. Burrows was optioned to Triple-A Indianapolis to begin the 2023 season.

Omar Cruz

Omar Alejandro Cruz (born January 26, 1999) is a Mexican professional baseball pitcher in the Pittsburgh Pirates organization.

Cruz signed with the San Diego Padres as an international free agent in 2017. He made his professional debut in 2018 with the Rookie-level Arizona League Padres and was promoted to the Tri-City Dust Devils of the Class A Short Season Northwest League in July. Over 11 games (ten starts) with the two clubs, he pitched to a 1–1 record with a 1.91 ERA, striking out 59 batters over  innings. He returned to Tri-City to begin the 2019 season before he was promoted to the Fort Wayne TinCaps of the Class A Midwest League. He compiled a combined 2–3 record and 2.73 ERA over 12 starts, striking out 76 over 56 innings.

On January 19, 2021, Cruz (alongside David Bednar, Drake Fellows, Hudson Head, and Endy Rodríguez) was traded to the Pittsburgh Pirates in a three team deal that also sent Joe Musgrove to the Padres and Joey Lucchesi to the New York Mets. To begin the 2021 season, he was assigned to the Greensboro Grasshoppers of the High-A East. After seven starts in which he went 3–3 with a 3.45 ERA and 38 strikeouts over  innings, he was promoted to the Altoona Curve of the Double-A Northeast. Over 14 starts with Altoona, he went 3–4 with a 3.44 ERA over  innings. He returned to Altoona for the 2022 season. Over 23 games (five starts), Cruz posted a 3-3 record with a 5.03 ERA and 69 strikeouts over  innings.

Drake Fellows

Drake Robert Fellows (born March 6, 1998) is an American professional baseball pitcher for the Pittsburgh Pirates organization.

Fellows attended Joliet Catholic Academy in Joliet, Illinois and Vanderbilt University, where he played college baseball for the Vanderbilt Commodores. He was selected by the San Diego Padres in the sixth round of the 2019 Major League Baseball draft. He did not play in 2019 after signing, and did not play in 2020 due to the cancellation of the minor league season.

On January 19, 2021, Fellows was traded to the Pittsburgh Pirates in a three team trade that also sent David Bednar, Omar Cruz, Hudson Head and Endy Rodriguez to the Pirates, Joe Musgrove to the Padres and Joey Lucchesi to the New York Mets. He made his professional debut with the Florida Complex League Pirates and the Bradenton Marauders, but pitched only  innings due to an elbow injury.

Matt Fraizer

Matthew Teran Fraizer (born January 12, 1998) is an American professional baseball outfielder in the Pittsburgh Pirates organization.

Fraizer attended Clovis North High School in Clovis, California. He was drafted by the Oakland Athletics in the 38th round of the 2016 Major League Baseball Draft but did not sign and played college baseball at the University of Arizona. In 2018, he played collegiate summer baseball with the Orleans Firebirds of the Cape Cod Baseball League. He was selected by the Pittsburgh Pirates in the third round of the 2019 MLB draft and signed.

Fraizer made his professional debut with the West Virginia Black Bears, batting .221 over 43 games. He did not play a minor league game in 2020 due to the season being cancelled because of the COVID-19 pandemic. He started 2021 with the Greensboro Grasshoppers before being promoted to the Altoona Curve. Over 112 games between the two teams, he slashed .306/.388/.552 with 23 home runs, 68 RBIs, and 15 stolen bases.

Matt Gorski

Matthew Gorski (born December 22, 1997) is an American professional baseball outfielder in the Pittsburgh Pirates organization. He played college baseball for the Indiana Hoosiers.

Gorski grew up in Fishers, Indiana and attended Hamilton Southeastern High School.

Gorski played college baseball at Indiana for three seasons. As a freshman, he batted .288 with four home runs. After the season, Gorski played collegiate summer baseball for the Amsterdam Mohawks of the Perfect Game Collegiate Baseball League. Gorski was named first team All-Big Ten Conference as a sophomore after he hit for .356 average with eight home runs and a team-high 79 hits. He played for the Harwich Mariners of the Cape Cod Baseball League in the following summer of 2018. Gorski batted .271 with 12 home runs and was named second team All-Big Ten in his junior season.

Gorski was selected in the second round of the 2019 Major League Baseball draft by the Pittsburgh Pirates. After signing with the team he was assigned to the West Virginia Black Bears of the Class A Short Season New York–Penn League. Gorski spent the 2021 season with the High-A Greensboro Grasshoppers and batted .223 with 17 home runs and 56 RBIs. Gorski began the 2022 season with Greensboro. In late May, he was promoted to the Altoona Curve. In late June, he suffered a quadriceps injury and was placed on the 60-day injured list.

Indiana Hoosiers bio

Hudson Head

John Hudson Head (born April 8, 2001) is an American professional baseball outfielder for the Pittsburgh Pirates organization.

Head attended Winston Churchill High School in San Antonio, Texas. As a senior in 2019, he batted .615 with 14 home runs. He committed to play college baseball for the Oklahoma Sooners. He was selected by the San Diego Padres in the third round of the 2019 Major League Baseball draft. He signed with the Padres for a $3 million signing bonus, a record for a player taken in the third round.

Head made his professional debut with the Rookie-level Arizona League Padres, batting .283 with one home run and seven doubles over 32 games. He did not play a minor league game in 2020 since the season was cancelled due to the COVID-19 pandemic.

On January 19, 2021, Head was traded to the Pittsburgh Pirates as part of a three team trade that also sent David Bednar, Omar Cruz, Drake Fellows and Endy Rodriguez to the Pirates, Joe Musgrove to the Padres and Joey Lucchesi to the New York Mets. He spent the 2021 season with the Bradenton Marauders of the Low-A Southeast, slashing .213/.362/.394 with 15 home runs, fifty RBIs, and 16 doubles over 101 games.

José Hernández

José Ernesto Hernández (born December 31, 1997) is an Dominican professional baseball pitcher for the Pittsburgh Pirates of Major League Baseball.

The Pirates selected Hernández from the Los Angeles Dodgers in the 2022 Rule 5 draft.

Jared Jones

Jared Keith Jones (born August 6, 2001) is an American professional baseball pitcher in the Pittsburgh Pirates organization.

Jones attended La Mirada High School in La Mirada, California. He was drafted by the Pittsburgh Pirates in the second round of the 2020 Major League Baseball draft. He signed with the Pirates rather than play college baseball at the University of Texas at Austin.

Jones made his professional debut in 2021 with the Bradenton Marauders. Over 18 games (15 starts), he went 3–6 with a 4.64 ERA and 103 strikeouts over 66 innings.

Brennan Malone

Brennan Russell Malone (born September 8, 2000) is an American professional baseball pitcher in the Pittsburgh Pirates organization.

Malone attended Porter Ridge High School in Indian Trail, North Carolina before transferring to IMG Academy in Bradenton, Florida for his senior year. At IMG, he was recorded throwing as high as 97 miles per hour. He committed to play college baseball at the University of North Carolina.

Malone was drafted by the Arizona Diamondbacks in the first round of the 2019 Major League Baseball draft, making him one of only three high school pitchers selected in the first round of the 2019 draft. He signed for $2.2 million. After signing, he was assigned to the Arizona League Diamondbacks, going 1–2 with a 5.14 ERA over seven innings. He also pitched in one game for the Hillsboro Hops at the end of the year.

On January 27, 2020, the Diamondbacks traded Malone and Liover Peguero to the Pittsburgh Pirates in exchange for Starling Marte and cash considerations. He did not play a minor league game in 2020 since the season was cancelled due to the COVID-19 pandemic. He missed a majority of the 2021 season due to a lat injury, and pitched only 14 innings for the year.

Kyle Nicolas

Kyle Todd Nicolas (born February 22, 1999) is an American professional baseball pitcher in the Pittsburgh Pirates organization.

Nicolas grew up in Massillon, Ohio and attended Jackson High School, where he played baseball and basketball. He won state titles in both sports as a senior and was named the Federal League Co-Player of the Year in baseball after going 8–0 with a save and a 0.50 ERA on the mound while also batting .349 with 24 RBIs.

Nicolas played for the Ball State Cardinals for three seasons. In 2019, he played collegiate summer baseball with the Cotuit Kettleers of the Cape Cod Baseball League. As a junior, Nicolas went 0–1 with a 2.74 ERA in four starts before the season was cut short due to the coronavirus pandemic.

Nicolas was selected 61st overall by the Miami Marlins in the 2020 Major League Baseball draft. After not playing in the minor leagues in 2020 following the cancelation of the season due to Covid-19, he began the 2021 season with the High-A Beloit Snappers. Nicolas was promoted to the Double-A Pensacola Blue Wahoos after posting 3–2 record with a 5.28 ERA and 86 strikeouts in  innings with Beloit.

On November 29, 2021, Nicolas was traded along with Zach Thompson and Connor Scott to the Pittsburgh Pirates in exchange for Jacob Stallings.

Nicolas is the nephew of former Penn State and NFL quarterback Todd Blackledge.

Ball State Cardinals bio

Malcom Núñez

Malcom Yaniel Núñez (born March 9, 2001) is a Cuban professional baseball first baseman and third baseman in the Pittsburgh Pirates organization.

Núñez signed with the St. Louis Cardinals as an international free agent in July 2018. He made his professional debut that year with the Dominican Summer League Cardinals. He played 2019 with the Johnson City Cardinals and Peoria Chiefs.

Núñez did not play for a team in 2020, due to the Minor League Baseball season being cancelled because of the COVID-19 pandemic. He returned in 2021 to play for Peoria and Springfield Cardinals and started 2022 with Springfield.

On August 1, 2022, Núñez and Johan Oviedo were traded to the Pittsburgh Pirates for José Quintana and Chris Stratton. He was assigned to the Altoona Curve.

Endy Rodríguez

Endy Steven Rodríguez (born May 26, 2000) is a Dominican professional baseball catcher in the Pittsburgh Pirates organization.

Rodríguez signed with the New York Mets as an international free agent in July 2018. He made his professional debut that year with the Dominican Summer League Mets. In 2019, he played for the Dominican Summer League Mets and Gulf Coast Mets. He did not play for a team in 2020 after the Minor League Baseball season was cancelled due to the COVID-19 pandemic.

On January 19, 2021, Rodríguez was traded from the Mets to the Pirates in a three-team trade between the Pirates, Mets and San Diego Padres. He started his Pirates career playing for the Bradenton Marauders and began 2022 with the Greensboro Grasshoppers.

Rodríguez was optioned to the Triple-A Indianapolis Indians to begin the 2023 season.

Colin Selby

Colin Selby (born October 24, 1997) is an American professional baseball pitcher in the Pittsburgh Pirates organization.

Selby played college baseball at Randolph-Macon College. He was drafted by the Pittsburgh Pirates in the 16th round of the 2018 Major League Baseball draft.

The Pirates added Selby to their 40-man roster after the 2022 season. Selby was optioned to the Triple-A Indianapolis Indians to begin the 2023 season.

Jun-Seok Shim

Jun-Seok Shim (born April 9, 2004) is a Korean baseball pitcher in the Pittsburgh Pirates organization.

Shim attended Duksoo High School in Seoul, South Korea. In 2020, he went 4-1 with a 1.42 ERA and 32 strikeouts over 19 innings pitched. Shim suffered a elbow injury that hampered his 2021 season. He struggled with a back injury in 2022 and pitched  innings over 12 appearances, posting a 5.14 ERA with 40 strikeouts and 22 walks. Shim did not apply for the 2022 Korea Baseball Organization Draft and hired agent Scott Boras to focus on being signed by a Major League Baseball (MLB) team as an international free agent.

Shim was signed by the Pittsburgh Pirates on January 26, 2023, and received a $750,000 signing bonus.

Sammy Siani

Samuel James Siani (born December 14, 2000) is an American professional baseball outfielder in the Pittsburgh Pirates organization.

Siani attended William Penn Charter School in Philadelphia, Pennsylvania. In 2019, his senior year, he hit .457 with 25 RBIs and 16 stolen bases. Siani was named the 2019 Pennsylvania High School Player of the Year by Perfect Game. He committed to play college baseball at Duke University.

Siani was selected by the Pittsburgh Pirates with the 37th overall pick in the 2019 Major League Baseball draft. He signed for $2.15 million and was assigned to the Rookie-level Gulf Coast League Pirates. Over 39 games, he batted .241 with three doubles, nine RBIs, and five stolen bases. He did not play a minor league game in 2020 due to the cancellation of the minor league season caused by the COVID-19 pandemic. To begin the 2021 season, he was assigned to the Bradenton Marauders of the Low-A Southeast. In mid-July, he was placed on the injured list, and returned in early September. Over 62 games with Bradenton, Siani slashed .215/.376/.390 with eight home runs and 35 RBIs.

Siani was assigned to the Greensboro Grasshoppers of the High-A South Atlantic League for the 2022 season. Over 82 games, he batted .201 with seven home runs, 28 RBIs, and 25 doubles.

Siani's older brother, Mike, plays in MLB for the Cincinnati Reds.

Hunter Stratton

Hunter Stratton (born November 17, 1996) is an American professional baseball pitcher in the Pittsburgh Pirates organization.

Stratton attended Sullivan East High School in Bluff City, Tennessee, where he finished his high school career with 168 strikeouts and was inducted into their Hall of Fame. He played two seasons of college baseball at Walters State Community College, throwing two no-hitters during his sophomore year. Following the end of his sophomore year, he was selected by the Pittsburgh Pirates in the 16th round of the 2017 Major League Baseball draft.

Stratton signed with the Pirates and made his professional debut with the Bristol Pirates of the Rookie-level Appalachian League, going 0–2 with a 4.81 ERA and 38 strikeouts over 43 innings. He spent the 2018 season with the West Virginia Power of the Class A South Atlantic League with whom he appeared in 22 games (making twenty starts) and went 6–5 with a 4.16 ERA and 82 strikeouts over  innings. In 2019, he pitched for the Bradenton Marauders of the Class A-Advanced Florida State League where he pitched 72 innings and compiled a 5–4 record and 4.25 ERA. He did not play a minor league game in 2020 due the cancellation of the minor league season. Stratton began the 2021 season with the Altoona Curve of the Double-A Northeast and was promoted to the Indianapolis Indians of the Triple-A East during the season. Over 38 relief appearances between the two teams, he went 2–2 with a 2.39 ERA and seventy strikeouts over 49 innings. After the season, he played in the Dominican Winter League for the Gigantes del Cibao. He returned to the Indians for the 2022 season. Over 46 relief appearances, he posted a 2-6 record with a 5.71 ERA and 82 strikeouts over 63 innings.

Tahnaj Thomas

Tahnaj A'kheel Thomas (born June 16, 1999) is a Bahamian professional baseball pitcher in the Pittsburgh Pirates organization.

Thomas signed with the Cleveland Indians as an international free agent in 2016. He spent his first professional season in 2017 with the Dominican Summer League Indians and Arizona League Indians, going 0–5 with a 5.63 ERA over  innings, and played 2018 with the Arizona League Indians where he posted a 4.58 ERA over  innings.

On November 14, 2018 the Indians traded Thomas, Erik González and Dante Mendoza to the Pittsburgh Pirates for Jordan Luplow and Max Moroff. Thomas spent his first season with the Pirates organization in 2019 with the Bristol Pirates and pitched to a 2–3 record with a 3.17 ERA and 59 strikeouts over  innings. He did not play a minor league game in 2020 since the season was cancelled due to the COVID-19 pandemic. Thomas spent 2021 with the Greensboro Grasshoppers. Over 16 starts, Thomas went 3–3 with a 5.19 ERA and 62 strikeouts over  innings.

Jared Triolo

Jared Robert Triolo (born February 8, 1998) is an American professional baseball third baseman in the Pittsburgh Pirates organization.

Triolo attended Lake Travis High School in Austin, Texas, where he earned All-State honors in baseball as a senior in 2016. After graduating, he enrolled at the University of Houston where he played college baseball. In 2017 and 2018, he played collegiate summer baseball with the Bourne Braves of the Cape Cod Baseball League and was named a league all-star in 2018. As a junior at Houston in 2019, Triolo slashed .332/.420/.512 with seven home runs and 44 RBIs over 56 games. After the season, he was selected by the Pittsburgh Pirates with the 72nd overall selection in the 2019 Major League Baseball draft. He signed for $870,700.

Triolo made his professional debut with the West Virginia Black Bears of the Class A Short Season New York–Penn League where he batted .239 with two home runs and 34 RBIs over sixty games. He did not play a minor league game in 2020 due to the cancellation of the season. He played the 2021 season with the Greensboro Grasshoppers of the High-A East, slashing .304/.369/.480 with 15 home runs, 42 RBIs, 29 doubles, and 25 stolen bases over 108 games. He was awarded a Minor League Gold Glove for his defense at third base. He was assigned to the Altoona Curve of the Double-A Eastern League for the 2022 season. Over 112 games, Triolo slashed .282/.376/.419 with nine home runs, 39 RBIs, and 24 stolen bases.

On November 15, 2022, the Pirates selected Triolo's contract and added him to the 40-man roster. Triolo was optioned to the Triple-A Indianapolis Indians to begin the 2023 season.

Eddy Yean

Eddy Yean (born July 25, 2001) is a Dominican professional baseball pitcher in the Pittsburgh Pirates organization.

The Nationals signed Yean as an international amateur free agent out of the Dominican Republic in July 2017, giving him a $100,000 signing bonus. After beginning his professional career in the Dominican Summer League in 2018, Yean advanced to Class A Short Season ball in 2019, pitching for the Auburn Doubledays. In 2020, MLB Pipeline rated Yean as the Nationals' sixth-best prospect overall and forecast that he would continue rising as a prospect.

Yean pitches right-handed, releasing the ball from a three-quarters arm slot. He also throws a slider and a changeup.

On December 24, 2020, Yean along with Wil Crowe were traded to the Pittsburgh Pirates in exchange for Josh Bell.

Chavez Young

Chavez Young (born July 8, 1997) is an Bahamian professional baseball outfielder in the Pittsburgh Pirates organization.

Young moved to the United States when he was 15, and attended Faith Baptist Christian Academy in Brandon, Florida for two years. In his final year of high school, Young attended the same school in Ludowici, Georgia, and was selected in the 39th round of the 2016 Major League Baseball draft by the Toronto Blue Jays. He was assigned to the Rookie-level Gulf Coast League Blue Jays, and batted .274 with six runs batted in (RBI) and six stolen bases in 21 games played. Young played the 2017 season with the Rookie Advanced Bluefield Blue Jays and Short Season-A Vancouver Canadians. In 67 total games, he hit .283 with four home runs and 30 RBI.

Chavez was assigned to the Class-A Lansing Lugnuts for the entire 2018 season. He was named a mid-season All-Star after hitting .307 with 18 doubles, two home runs, and 18 stolen bases. In total, Young played in 125 games for the Lugnuts in 2018, and hit .285 with 33 doubles, nine triples, eight home runs, 57 RBI, and 44 stolen bases.

On January 10, 2023, Young was traded to the Pittsburgh Pirates for Zach Thompson.

Full Triple-A to Rookie League rosters

Triple-A

Double-A

High-A

Single-A

Rookie

Foreign Rookie

References 

Minor league players
Lists of minor league baseball players